Matt Moore (January 8, 1888 – January 20, 1960) was an Irish-born American actor and director. He appeared in at least 221 motion pictures from 1912 to 1958.

Biography
Born in Fordstown Crossroads, County Meath, Ireland, he and his brothers, Tom, Owen, and Joe, and a sister Mary Moore (1890-1919), he emigrated to the United States as a steerage passenger on board the S.S. Anchoria and was inspected on Ellis Island in May 1896 . They all went on to successful movie careers.

Once his brothers made a name for themselves, Moore made his debut in the role as the minister in the silent short Tangled Relations (1912) starring Florence Lawrence and Owen Moore. In 1913, Matt Moore had a prominent role in the "white slavery" drama, Traffic in Souls.

Moore played the role as Hector MacDonald in the MGM crime/drama The Unholy Three (1925) co-starring Lon Chaney and Mae Busch, which was a huge hit that year. He played the role as Stanley "Stan" Wentworth in Coquette (1929) opposite Mary Pickford and Johnny Mack Brown. Coquette was the first talkie of Pickford, ex-wife of his brother Owen.

As time passed, Moore took smaller character roles and remained active in the motion picture industry. His final appearance was in the uncredited role as Charlie Bates in the horror/thriller I Bury the Living (1958), which starred Richard Boone and Theodore Bikel.

Moore has a star for his work in motions pictures on the Hollywood Walk of Fame at 6301 Hollywood Boulevard. He was very fond of his two cats, having them appear in several of his movies, and both have a star in the animal section of the Hollywood Walk of Fame.

Death 
Moore died of undisclosed causes on January 20, 1960, in Hollywood, California, aged 72.

Selected filmography

Traffic in Souls (1913) - Officer Burke - Officer 4434
A Singular Sinner (1914)
20,000 Leagues Under the Sea (1916) - Lieutenant Bond
The Pride of the Clan (1917) - Jamie Campbell
Runaway Romany (1917) - Bud Haskell
Heart of the Wilds (1918) - Val Galbraith
The Bondage of Barbara (1919) - Harry Chambers
A Wild Goose Chase (1919)
Getting Mary Married (1919) - Ted Barnacle
The Unpardonable Sin (1919) - Nol Windsor
The Unwritten Code (1919) - Dick Tower
Sahara (1919) - John Stanley
The Dark Star (1919) - Prince Alak
The Glorious Lady (1919) - The Duke of Loame
A Regular Girl (1919) - Robert King
Don't Ever Marry (1920) - Joe Benson
Whispers (1920) - Pat Darrick
The Sport of Kings (1920) - Sale Kernan
Hairpins (1920) - Rex Rossmore
 Love Madness (1920) - Lloyd Norwood
The Passionate Pilgrim (1921) - Henry Calverly
Straight Is the Way (1921) - 'Cat' Carter
The Miracle of Manhattan (1921) - Larry Marshall
A Man's Home (1921) - Arthur Lynn
Back Pay (1922) - Jerry Newcombe
Sisters (1922) - Peter Joyce
The Storm (1922) - Dave Stewart
The Jilt (1922) - George Prothero
Minnie (1922) - newspaper man
Drifting (1923) - Capt. Arthur Davis
Strangers of the Night (1923) - Ambrose Applejohn
White Tiger (1923) - Dick Longworth
No More Women (1924) - Peter Maddox
The Breaking Point (1924) - Judson Clark
A Self-Made Failure (1924) - John Steele
Fools in the Dark (1924) - Percy Schwartz / Percy Primrose
The Wise Virgin (1924) - Bob Hanford
Another Man's Wife (1924) - Phillip Cochran
A Lost Lady (1924) - Neil Herbert
The Narrow Street (1925) - Simon Haldane
The Way of a Girl (1925) - George
How Baxter Butted In (1925) - Henry Baxter
Grounds for Divorce (1925) - Maurice Sorbier
The Unholy Three (1925) - Hector McDonald
His Majesty, Bunker Bean (1925) - Bunker Bean
Where the Worst Begins (1925) - Donald Van Dorn
Three Weeks in Paris (1925) - Oswald Bates
His Jazz Bride (1926) - Dick Gregory
The First Year (1926) - Tom Tucker
The Caveman (1926) - Mike Smagg
Early to Wed (1926) - Tommy Carter
The Mystery Club (1926) - Dick Bernard
Diplomacy (1926) - Robert Lowry
Summer Bachelors (1926) - Walter Blakely
The Honorable Mr. Buggs (1927, Short) - Mr. Buggs
Tillie the Toiler (1927) - J. Cornelius MacDougall
Married Alive (1927) - Charles Orme
Phyllis of the Follies (1928) - Howard Decker
Beware of Blondes (1928) - Jeffrey
Dry Martini (1928) - Freddie Fletcher
Coquette (1929) - Stanley Wentworth
Side Street (1929) - John O'Farrell
Call of the West (1930) - Lon Dixon
The Squealer (1930) - John Sheridan
The Front Page (1931) - Kruger
Stout Hearts and Willing Hands (1931, Short) - Lookalike Bartender 3
Penrod and Sam (1931) - Henry Schofield
Consolation Marriage (1931) - The Colonel
Cock of the Air (1932) - Terry
Rain (1932) - Dr. Macphail
The Pride of the Legion (1932) - Cavanaugh
Little Orphan Annie (1932) - Dr. Griffiths
Deluge (1933) - Tom
All Men Are Enemies (1934) - Allerton
Such Women Are Dangerous (1934) - George Ryan
Anything Goes (1936) - Capt. McPhail
Absolute Quiet (1936) - Pilot
Bad Boy (1939) - Henchman (uncredited)
Range War (1939) - Jim Marlow
Santa Fe Marshal (1940) - Watchman (uncredited)
The Trial of Mary Dugan (1941) - Bailiff (uncredited)
My Life with Caroline (1941) - Walters
Unexpected Uncle (1941) - Detective (uncredited)
The Vanishing Virginian (1942) - Chas. Inglestadt (uncredited)
Mokey (1942) - Mr. Pennington
The Mayor of 44th Street (1942) - Jerry, Office Clerk (uncredited)
Harrigan's Kid (1943) - Racing Judge (uncredited)
Dr. Gillespie's Criminal Case (1943) - Harper (uncredited)
Happy Land (1943) - Mr. Prentiss (uncredited)
Wilson (1944) - Albert S. Burleson - Postmaster General (uncredited)
Mrs. Parkington (1944) - Ball Guest (uncredited)
Spellbound (1945) - Policeman at Train Station (uncredited)
She Went to the Races (1945) - Duffy, Hilda's Trainer (uncredited)
The Hoodlum Saint (1946) - Father Duffy
Love Laughs at Andy Hardy (1946) - Traffic Policeman (uncredited)
That's My Man (1947) - Bowler's Owner (uncredited)
B.F.'s Daughter (1948) - Connecticut Mansion Butler (uncredited)
Good Sam (1948) - Mr. Butler
Joan of Arc (1948) - Judge Courneille (uncredited)
Neptune's Daughter (1949) - Swim Race Official (uncredited)
That Forsyte Woman (1949) - Timothy Forsyte
Malaya (1949) - George - Prison Official (uncredited)
The Reformer and the Redhead (1950) - Parkers' Butler (uncredited)
Please Believe Me (1950) - Minor Role (uncredited)
The Big Hangover (1950) - Mr. Rumlie
Mystery Street (1950) - Dr. Rockton (uncredited)
The Happy Years (1950) - Travers Family Butler (uncredited)
Grounds for Marriage (1951) - Critic (uncredited)
Three Guys Named Mike (1951) - Mr. Tannen (uncredited)
Inside Straight (1951) - Broker (uncredited)
Mr. Imperium (1951) - Gateman (uncredited)
The Great Caruso (1951) - Matt - the Doorman (uncredited)
Night into Morning (1951) - Prof. Joe Goodman (uncredited)
Rich, Young and Pretty (1951) - Doctor (uncredited)
The Law and the Lady (1952) - Senator Scholmm (uncredited)
Too Young to Kiss (1951) - Charles, Wainwright's Butler (uncredited)
Invitation (1952) - Paul, the Butler
Plymouth Adventure (1952) - William Mullins (uncredited)
Scandal at Scourie (1953) - Kenston (uncredited)
Latin Lovers (1953) - Board Member (uncredited)
The Great Diamond Robbery (1954) - Preacher (uncredited)
Executive Suite (1954) - Servant (uncredited)
Gypsy Colt (1954) - Tourist (uncredited)
Yankee Pasha (1954) - Bearded Slave (uncredited)
Seven Brides for Seven Brothers (1954) - Ruth's Uncle
The Last Time I Saw Paris (1954) - Englishman (uncredited)
The King's Thief (1955) - Gentleman (uncredited)
The Birds and the Bees (1956) - Passenger (uncredited)
Pardners (1956) - Cowboy (uncredited)
These Wilder Years (1956) - Ed, the Gateman (uncredited)
Designing Woman (1957) - Stage Doorman (uncredited)
An Affair to Remember (1957) - Father McGrath (uncredited)
The Helen Morgan Story (1957) - Bum (uncredited)
I Bury the Living (1958) - Charlie Bates (uncredited) (final film role)

References

External links

1888 births
1960 deaths
American film directors
American male film actors
American male silent film actors
Irish male film actors
Irish male silent film actors
Irish emigrants to the United States (before 1923)
People from County Meath
20th-century American male actors
20th-century Irish male actors